Black Orchid is a 1953 British mystery film directed by Charles Saunders and starring Ronald Howard, Olga Edwardes, and John Bentley. The screenplay concerns a physician who is implicated in the death of his wife which allowed him to marry her sister.

Cast
 Ronald Howard ...  Dr. John Winnington
 Olga Edwardes ...  Christine Shaw
 John Bentley ...  Eric Blair
 Mary Laura Wood ...  Sophie Winnington
 Patrick Barr ...  Vincent Humphries
 Sheila Burrell ...  Annette
 Russell Napier ...  Inspector Markham
 Mary Jones ...  Mrs. Humphries
 Alan Robinson ...  Solicitor
 Ian Fleming ...  Coroner
 Tom Gill ...  Travel Agent Clerk
 Tucker McGuire ...  American Woman
 Richard Shaw ...  Lorry Driver
 Daniel Wherry ...  Padre

Critical reception
Sky movies wrote, "following his success in the title parts of the Paul Temple and Toff films, John Bentley starred in this murder melodrama which is very typical of British second feature production of the period."

References

External links

1953 films
British mystery films
Films directed by Charles Saunders
1950s mystery films
British black-and-white films
1950s English-language films
1950s British films